Mika Sue Boorem (born August 18, 1987) is an American actress and filmmaker. She began her career as a child actress, appearing on television in small guest roles on Touched by an Angel and Ally McBeal, before earning critical acclaim for her performance in The Education of Little Tree (1997). After being cast in supporting roles in Jack Frost and Mighty Joe Young (both 1998), Boorem had a lead role in the drama Hearts in Atlantis (2001), opposite Anton Yelchin and Anthony Hopkins, which garnered her further critical acclaim.

Boorem also had prominent supporting roles in the war drama The Patriot (2000) and the thriller Along Came a Spider (2001). She went on to star in numerous teen films in the early-to-mid 2000s, including the surf film Blue Crush (2002), the comedy Sleepover (2004), and the drama Augusta, Gone (2006). Boorem was a recurring guest star on the network series Dawson's Creek in 2002 and 2003. She had a central role in John Carpenter's horror film The Ward (2010), followed by roles in several independent films.

Boorem made her feature film directorial debut with Hollywood.Con (2021), starring Tom Arnold and Brian Krause.

Life and career

Early life
Boorem was born on August 18, 1987, at Carondelet St. Joseph's Hospital in Tucson, Arizona, to Holly (née Thomas) and Benjamin Boorem. She has one older brother, Benjamin Jr. Her father is a gemologist. She began acting in local theater in Arizona, and subsequently moved to Los Angeles with her family, where she attended Le Lycée Français de Los Angeles, a French-English bilingual school.

Work as a child actress
After appearing as herself in the direct-to-video of Disney Sing-Along Songs called Beach Party at Walt Disney World in 1995, Boorem had her first televised role in 1996 as a guest on the series Touched by an Angel. That was followed by a supporting part in The Education of Little Tree (1997), based on the controversial memoir of the same name by Forrest Carter. David Noh of Film Journal International deemed her performance as a young friend of the titular Cherokee character "delightful." For her performance, she was nominated for a Young Artist Award. The same year, Boorem had a guest role playing the young Ally McBeal in the 1997 pilot episode. She also had a supporting role in A Walton Easter, a television film spin-off from The Waltons, which aired in the spring of 1997. She subsequently had a supporting role in the Christmas film Jack Frost (1998) starring Michael Keaton, for which she was nominated for a YoungStar Award for Best Actress in a Drama Film.

She then had a part in Disney's live-action film Mighty Joe Young (1998), playing the young counterpart of Charlize Theron's character. She appeared on television again as a main cast member of the comedy series The Tom Show, which aired for one season between 1997 and 1998; in the series, she portrayed the daughter of a television producer, played by Tom Arnold. In late 1999, Boorem had a supporting role in the ensemble drama Things You Can Tell Just by Looking at Her, opposite Glenn Close and Cameron Diaz.

Also in 2000, Boorem had a central role in the Revolutionary War historical drama The Patriot (2000), playing the daughter of a soldier (portrayed by Mel Gibson). For her performance, she was nominated for her third Young Artist Award as part of an ensemble cast. She subsequently appeared opposite Morgan Freeman and Anton Yelchin in the thriller Along Came a Spider (2001), playing the kidnapped daughter of a United States Senator. The following year, she was again cast opposite Yelchin with a lead in the drama Hearts in Atlantis (2001), playing a young girl who has mysterious interactions with an elderly man (played by Anthony Hopkins) in her community. A supporting role in Penny Marshall's period drama Riding in Cars with Boys (2001) followed, and a part as the younger sister of Kate Bosworth in the surf film Blue Crush (2002). In 2003, she had a supporting role opposite Julia Stiles and Shirley MacLaine in the romantic comedy Carolina. Between 2002 and 2003, Boorem had a recurring guest role on the sixth season of the series Dawson's Creek, portraying Harley Hetson. For her role, she earned a Teen Choice Award nomination for Choice TV Sidekick.

Transition to teen and adult roles
In 2004, Boorem starred opposite Alexa Vega in the teen comedy Sleepover, followed by a supporting part in the dance film Dirty Dancing: Havana Nights (2004).  In the independent drama Smile (2005), Boorem portrayed a teenager from Malibu who befriends a young Chinese woman with a facial deformity, played by Yi Ding. Critic Justin Chang of Variety deemed the film a "well-meaning but dramatically lopsided tearjerker."

The following year, Boorem starred as the lead in The Initiation of Sarah, an ABC Family television film and remake of the 1978 horror film of the same name, as well as in the television drama film Augusta, Gone, in which she portrayed a teenaged drug addict. Tom Jicha of the Sun-Sentinel praised her performance in the film, writing: "... the meatiest role belongs to Mika Boorem. The relative unknown plays Augusta Dudman, a 14-year-old with typical teenage insecurities and self-esteem problems. This makes her willing prey for a more advanced child of the streets named Rain, who introduces Augusta to the temptations of drugs and sex. Boorem handles the role as if she's in it for more than a paycheck, which cannot be said of all her co-stars." In 2007, she had a guest-starring role on the medical drama series House, appearing in the episode "Insensitive" as a teenager suffering from CIPA, a condition that prevents her from sensing pain.

She guest-starred on the series Ghost Whisperer in 2008, appearing in the episode "Bloodline," and the same year had a minor role in the drama Trucker. Boorem was also featured in David Cook's music video "Light On" in 2008. In 2010, she had a supporting part as the ghost of a psychiatric patient in John Carpenter's psychological horror film The Ward, opposite Amber Heard and Danielle Panabaker. The Hollywood Reporters Michael Rechtshaffen, in reviewing the film, noted it as "an economical period piece that still effectively demonstrates what a skilled technician can accomplish in a single location with a compact cast and sturdy old-school effects."

Directing and other projects
In 2012, Boorem appeared opposite Kelly Lynch in the Armand Mastroianni thriller Dark Desire. Boorem was also cast in the 2013 short film Awake, which was subsequently included in the 2016 horror anthology Minutes Past Midnight.

In 2015, Boorem directed the short film Love Thy Neighbor, which earned her a Best Director award at the Hang Onto Your Shorts film festival in New Jersey. She made her feature film directorial debut with Hollywood.Con (2021), an action-adventure comedy set in Guatemala and starring Tom Arnold, Paige Howard, Devin Ratray, Brian Krause and Cody Kasch, as well as Boorem herself.

Hollywood.Con was co-written and produced by Boorem's father, Benjamin Boorem, and its premise was partly inspired by a trip the two had taken to buy jade. In April 2019, Boorem visited Arkansas Arts Academy to present a workshop on the film industry, and students from the academy served as videographers for the premiere screening of Hollywood.Con on May 4, 2019, in Eureka Springs, Arkansas.

Filmography

Film

Television

Music videos

Accolades

Notes

References

External links

 Official website
 
 
 

1987 births
Living people
20th-century American actresses
21st-century American actresses
Actresses from Tucson, Arizona
American child actresses
American film actresses
American music video directors
American television actresses
American women film directors
American women film producers
American women screenwriters
Female music video directors
Film directors from Arizona
Lycée Français de Los Angeles alumni
Screenwriters from Arizona